"Let Me Tell You About Love" is a song written by Carl Perkins, Paul Kennerley and Brent Maher, and recorded by American country music duo The Judds.  It was released in June 1989 as the second single from the album River of Time.  The song was The Judds' fourteenth and final number one on the country chart.  The RCA/Curb single, 8947-7-R, b/w "Water of Love", went to number one for one week and spent a total of fifteen weeks on the country chart. The record also reached number one on the Canadian RPM Country Tracks chart.

Carl Perkins played lead guitar on the recording.

The song appeared on their 1991 Greatest Hits Volume Two collection. It was also the last country number one by a duo or vocal collaboration until Brooks & Dunn's "Brand New Man" in 1991.

Content
The song is about a romance between "Sheba" and Solomon, however the historical Bathsheba was Solomon's mother, not his lover. Solomon is said to have married the Queen of Sheba.

Chart performance
"Let Me Tell You About Love" debuted on the U.S. Billboard Hot Country Singles & Tracks for the week of July 8, 1989.

Year-end charts

References

1989 singles
The Judds songs
Songs written by Carl Perkins
Songs written by Paul Kennerley
RCA Records singles
Curb Records singles
Songs written by Brent Maher
Song recordings produced by Brent Maher
1989 songs